Mary Stearns may refer to:
 Mary Kay Stearns, American actress
 Mary Beth Stearns, American solid-state physicist